Qarasuçu (also, Karasuchilar and Karasuchu) is a village in the Goranboy Rayon of Azerbaijan.  The village forms part of the municipality of Hazırəhmədli.

Notable natives 

 Mammad Maharramov — Hero of the Soviet Union.

References 

Populated places in Goranboy District